I Think I Love My Wife is a 2007 American romantic comedy film starring Chris Rock, Gina Torres and Kerry Washington.  Rock co-wrote the film with Louis C.K. and also directed and produced it. It is a remake of the 1972 French film Love in the Afternoon by Éric Rohmer.

Plot
Richard Cooper is a happily married and successful man. He is content with his home life in suburban New York with his lovely wife Brenda, a teacher, and his two young children. There is one problem in his marriage: their sex life has stagnated, leaving Richard frustrated and sex-starved. While at work, he occasionally fantasizes about other women, but never acts upon his impulses.

An encounter with an attractive old friend, Nikki Tru, suddenly casts doubt over his typically resilient self-control. At first she claims to just want to be his friend, but she begins to show up consistently at his Manhattan financial office just to talk or have lunch, which causes his boss, secretaries, and peers to view him with varying degrees of contempt. When Nikki begins to deliberately seduce Richard, he does not know what to do. Against his better judgment, he flies with her out of town for one day on an errand, where he is beaten by her boyfriend. On the way home, Nikki kisses Richard who stops it quickly.

Returning to New York, he returns too late to make a sales presentation at an important business meeting, causing the loss of a lucrative contract and almost his job in the process. Richard reluctantly pursues Nikki still, but when tensions are deep with a suspicious Brenda, he breaks things off with her. Things slowly improve in Richard's usual routine and love life. Months later, Nikki shows up at his office unannounced. Having lunch, Richard learns that she is currently engaged to another successful man, and of her realization that she's getting older. Nikki later admits she's not in love with him and that she refuses to settle. Telling Richard that the two of them would be very happy together, he says regardless of his desires, his life isn't about what he wants.

Hearing this, Nikki says she and her fiancé are set to move to Los Angeles, with Nikki asking Richard to come to her apartment later to say a "proper goodbye". The morning of, he is conflicted. When he gets to Nikki's apartment, he finds her in her underwear in her bathroom. In the moments before Richard is about to consummate his attraction to Nikki, he realizes how grave the loss of his wife and children would be, so he walks out on Nikki, musing that you can't choose who you love in life, but you can choose how you love. Richard returns home, surprising his wife, and they begin to rebuild a genuine rapport, with the possibility of good things to come.

Cast
Chris Rock as Richard Cooper 
Gina Torres as Brenda Cooper
Kerry Washington as Nikki Tru
Steve Buscemi as George
Edward Herrmann as Mr. Landis
Adam LeFevre as Maitre'd
Welker White as Tracy
Samantha Ivers as Mary
Michael K. Williams as Teddy
Orlando Jones as Nelson
Eva Pigford as Hope
Cassandra Freeman as Jennifer
Stephen A. Smith as Allan
James Saito as Mr. Yuni
Wendell Pierce as Sean
Milan Howard as Kelly Cooper
Roz Ryan as Landlady
Christina Vidal as Candy
Eliza Coupe as Lisa
GQ as White Rapper
Stephanie D'Abruzzo as Cafe Entertainer (uncredited)

Production
Charles Stone III was slated to direct but dropped out.

This is the second time Rock and Washington have been paired on screen. Previously they were in Bad Company, playing a couple.

Mumbai-based UTV Motion Pictures made its entry into the American market by co-producing the film.

Rocks' character works at the firm of Pupkin & Langford, a reference to the 1982 film The King of Comedy.

Reception
I Think I Love My Wife received generally negative reviews. Rotten Tomatoes reported a 19% approval rating, based on 105 critical reviews with the consensus "Chris Rock's comedic instincts are muted and the female characters are unsatisfactorily drawn in this uneven sex farce/domestic drama mashup." Metacritic reported that critics rated the film 49/100  based on 30 reviews. It grossed $5 million on its opening weekend, reaching #5. The film grossed a worldwide total of $13 million.

DVD release and sales
The DVD was released on August 7, 2007, selling 214,778 units in the first week. At an aggregate, 863,437 units were sold which translated to revenue of $13,527,427.

References

External links
 
 
 
 

2007 films
2007 romantic comedy films
American romantic comedy films
2000s English-language films
Fox Searchlight Pictures films
American remakes of French films
Films directed by Chris Rock
Films with screenplays by Louis C.K.
Films with screenplays by Chris Rock
Films produced by Chris Rock
UTV Motion Pictures films
Éric Rohmer
2000s American films